The Meitei people, also known as the Manipuri people, are the predominant ethnic group of Manipur in Northeast India. They speak Meitei language (officially called Manipuri), one of the 22 official languages of the Indian Republic and the sole official language of Manipur. 
The Meiteis primarily settled in the Imphal Valley region in modern-day Manipur, though a sizable population has settled in the other Indian states of Assam, Tripura, Nagaland, Meghalaya, and Mizoram. There is also a notable presence of Meitei in the neighboring countries of Myanmar and Bangladesh. The Meitei ethnic group represents about 53% of Manipur's population.

Endonyms and exonyms
The Meitei are known by a number of endonyms, Meitei, Meetei, Meithei (Meitei), and as well as by numerous exonyms, such as Meckley, Manipuri, Cassay-Shan, and Kathe (Burmese). Mee and Mei are used interchangeably, together with atei form Meetei and Meitei. According to Cheitharon Kumbaba, Meitei means Mei+atei, where atei in Manipuri means others. The term Manipuri is widely used, but problematic because of its ambiguous scope: next to being a synonym for Meitei/Meetei, it can also refer in a wider sense to the native ethnic groups in the hills of Manipur.

Origins and history

The earliest sections of the Cheitharol Kumbaba, a Meitei chronicle, record the gradual spread of Meitei across Manipur and their assimilation of other clans into a confederacy.

Little documentation exists in the form of written records about Manipuri history concerning the spans between the Iron Age and the first millennium in Northeast India. The geopolitical history of the region along with the ethno-linguistic background of the inhabitants are largely unknown.

Language

The Meitei people speak the Meitei language (also known as the Manipuri language), a Tibeto-Burman language. Meitei is one of the officially recognized languages of India, and was included in the Eighth Schedule to the Constitution of India in 1992.

There are many Meitei language movements, including classical language movement (predominantly in Manipur), associate official language movement (in Assam), linguistic purism movement (predominantly in Manipur), etc. 

Historically and then after a long gap, presently, Meitei was written in an indigenous Meitei Mayek script. The script was replaced by an alphabet based on the Bengali script in the early 18th century. The Meitei Mayek script has seen a revival in recent decades, and is now seen in street signs, newspapers, literature, and legislative proceeding records.

In Assam, Manipuri is taught at the primary level, and at the graduate level in Gauhati University. It is not, however, an officially recognized language of the state. In Bangladesh, Manipuri is generally not spoken and the ethnic Manipuri are educated in Bengali rather than in their native Manipuri.

Some of the most notable Meitei historical literary works, written by court scholars, include:
Cheitharol Kumbaba, the royal chronicle of Meitei kings
Wakoklon Heelel Thilel Salai Amailon Pukok Puya, the oldest extant Meitei manuscript, first written in 1400 BCE and rediscovered in 1971
Puya (Meitei texts), preserved manuscripts (lit. meaning "accepted by ancestors")

Calendar

The Meitei follow a traditional calendar called Maliyafam Palcha Kumsing, which has 12 months and a 7-day week, like the Gregorian calendar.

Culture

Most of the rich culture of Manipur can be credited to the Meiteis. Since ancient times the valley region of Manipur was trading crossroads between India and Myanmar and gradually the valley portion of Manipur became the melting pot of Indo-Burmese culture. The famous Manipuri dance form had its roots from the Lai Haraoba dance form.

They are also known for their contribution to art, literature and cinema. M K Binodini Devi, Khwairakpam Chaoba Singh, Ratan Thiyam, Aribam Syam Sharma, Rajkumar Shitaljit Singh, Elangbam Nilakanta Singh, Heisnam Kanhailal and Sabitri Heisnam are some of the prominent personalities in the field.

The Meitei people are very fond of horse riding.

Art
The Manipuri martial art Thang-ta is a combative sport which had its origin from the Meitei knights during the kings rule. It involves various fighting techniques with swords and spears.

Theatre and cinema

The first Manipuri film, Matamgi Manipur, was released on 9 April 1972. Paokhum Ama (1983) is the first full-length colour feature film (according to the Academy's definition of a feature film) of Manipur and was directed by Aribam Syam Sharma. Lammei (2002) is the first Manipuri Video film to have a commercial screening at a theatre. As the production of video films gained momentum, the Manipur film industry got expanded and around 40–50 films are made each year.

Religion and festivals 

According to the 2011 census, Meiteis follow only two religions, with overwhelming majority of Meiteis practicing variants of Hinduism. Around 16% of Meiteis traditionally believe in Sanamahi religion named after god Sanamahi. Meiteis follow both Hinduism as well as Sanamahi religious traditions and rituals. For example, they worship Sanamahi in the south-west corners of their homes. The various types of festivals that are the most significant, and are celebrated with great joy by meiteis are Rasalila, Janmastami, Holi, Lai Haraoba, Cheiraoba, Yaosang, Jagannath Rath Yatra, Holi, Diwali, Ram Navami .

Cuisine

Rice, vegetables and fish are staple food of the Meiteis, although meat is also consumed but in traditional meitei dishes meat is never used in non-veg dishes. In traditional and cultural gatherings fish, snails, oysters, crabs, eels etc are the only non-veg used and a significant number of meiteis follow it where meat is cooked and eaten outside the house if consumed. Rice is the main carbohydrate source in a Meitei dish served with vegetables, fish, freshwater snails, crabs, oyesters, eels etc. Among the most famous species of fishes Manipuri Sareng (Wallago attu) or commonly known as Helicopter catfish, Hilsa (ilish Tenualosa ilisha), freshwater snails (pila (gastropod)) and edible oyesters are considered a delicacy. The vegetables are either made as stews (Kangsoi) with less oil/no oil used in sauteing, or stir fried directly in oil with various added spices to make an oily spicy side dish (Kanghou). Roasted/Smoked and Sun-dried fish or fried fresh fish is usually added in most of the stews and curry to impart special taste. The vegetables, herbs and fruits consumed in the region are more similar to those in Southeast/East/Central Asian, Siberian, Arctic, Polynesian and Micronesian cuisines such as Myanmar, Thailand, Inuit, etc. E.g. treebean (yongchak), galangal (loklei), culantro (awa phadigom), lime basil (mayangton), fishwort (tokningkhok) and many others, which are not cultivated in northern India. One of the most important ingredients in Meitei cooking is Ngari (fermented fish). Roasted ngari is used in the singju (a kind of salad), morok metpa (chilli chutney), iromba (boiled and mashed veggies with chillies). A variety of fermented bamboo shoots (soibum) as well as fresh bamboo shoots (Ushoi/Shoidon), and fermented soya beans (hawaijaar) also form an important part of Meitei cuisines. All meals are served with some fresh aromatic herbs on the side.

A typical every day Meitei meal will have rice, vegetable or fish curry, a piquant side dish (either morok metpa or iromba accompanied with herbs), a champhut (a steamed/boiled vegetable with little sugar, e.g., carrot, pumpkin or cucumber slices or steamed/boiled mustard green stems, etc without sugar), and a Kanghou. Meat cuisines are also popular amongst the Meiteis and some of the common meat curries are Yen Thongba (Chicken Curry) and Nganu Thongba (Duck Curry) and depending on regions Oak Thongba(Pork curry) and Shan Thongba(Beef curry).

Subsistence 
The Meitei are mainly agriculturists in which rice is a staple crop. However, they also grow mangoes, lemons, pineapples, oranges, guavas, and other fruits. Fishing is also common among the Meitei that can either be a profession or a hobby. Women tend to dominate the local markets as sellers of food items, textiles, and traditional clothing.

Sports

Traditional Meitei sports are still in existence, with some even spreading throughout the world.

Some sports are worth mentioned as follows:
Sagol Kangjei: It is the earliest form of modern-day Polo which traces its origin to Manipur. According to Guinness World Records (1992), " Polo can be traced to origins in Manipur state, India, C. 3100 CE when it was played as 'Sagol Kangjei.
Mukna Kang-jei: It is a form of Meitei Wrestling. It is considered to be the most masculine form of sports.
Huyen langlon: Huyen langlon is a martial art from Manipur. In the Manipuri language, huyen means war while langlon or langlong can mean net, knowledge or art. Huyen langlon consists of two main components: thang-ta (armed combat) and sarit sarak (unarmed fighting).  
Khong kangjei: It is a form of Meitei Hockey.
Kang Sanaba
Mukna Kangjei
Oolaobi (Woo-Laobi)
Arambai Hunba (throwing dart weapon)
They introduced polo to the west when the British came to Manipur valley during the kings rule. It is locally called Sagol Kangjei. It is believed that the game was played by the Gods of Meiteis as a practice of warfare.

Mukna a unique form of wrestling popular amongst the Meiteis.

Yubi lakpi is a traditional full contact game played by Meiteis using a coconut, which has some notable similarities to rugby. Yubi lakpi literally means "coconut snatching". The coconut is greased to make it slippery. There are rules of the game, as with all Manipur sports. It is played on the lush green turf. Each side has 7 players in a field with about 45x18 meters in area. The goal post is 4.5x3 meters box in the central portion of the goal line. The coconut serves the purpose of a ball and is offered to the king, the chief guest or the judges before the game begins. The aim is to run while carrying the greased coconut and physically cross over the goal line, while the other team tackles and blocks any such attempt as well as tries to grab the coconut and score on its own.

Heeyang Tanaba (Hi Yangba Tanaba) is a traditional boat rowing race and festivity of the Panas.

Diaspora

Myanmar (Burma) 

Myanmar is home to a sizable community of Meiteis, who are called Kathe in Burmese. Unlike other Hindu communities in Myanmar, the Meitei resemble other Burmese ethnic groups in terms of physical appearance, which has accelerated their assimilation and integration into Burmese society. In the early 1950s, Burmese Meiteis numbered approximately 40,000, with a third of them residing in Mandalay. Current estimates are approximately 25,000. Meiteis have resettled throughout the country, including in villages near Myitkyina to the north, Homalin, Kalewa, Pyay, in the center of the country, and Yangon to the south. They continue to practice Hinduism in Myanmar.

As a result of wars between Meitei kingdom and the Konbaung dynasty between the 17th and 18th centuries, many Meiteis were resettled in the Burmese kingdom. Some Meitei settlements in modern-day Myanmar originate from the 1758–1759 war, and from the Burmese occupation of Manipur from 1819 to 1826. Alaungpaya, during the former campaign, resettled Meiteis in Sagaing and Amarapura. The Meitei people's horsemanship skills were employed in the Burmese royal army, where they formed the elite Cassay cavalry (ကသည်းမြင်းတပ်) and artillery regiments (ကသည်းအမြောက်တပ်) which were employed during the Burmese–Siamese wars. The Burmese court also retained a retinue of Manipuri Brahmins called Bamons, also called Kathe Ponna (ကသည်းပုဏ္ဏား) to advise and conduct court rituals.

Notable Meiteis

See also
Eromba
Manipuri Brahmin
List of Manipuri kings
Meira Paibi
Ningthouja dynasty
Sajibu Nongma Panba

References

Sources

External links

 
Hindu ethnic groups
Ethnic groups in Manipur
Ethnic groups in Bangladesh
Ethnic groups in Myanmar
Ethnic groups in Northeast India
Ethnic groups in South Asia
Ethnic groups in Southeast Asia
Linguistic groups of the constitutionally recognised official languages of India